Deiphobe may refer to
 Cumaean Sibyl, an ancient Greek priestess 
 Deiphobe (mantis), a genus of insects

See also
 Deiphobus, a son of Priam and Hecuba in Greek mythology